Mieczysław Stoor (5 September 1929 – 5 October 1973) was a Polish film actor. He appeared in 37 films between 1954 and 1973.

Selected filmography
 Boleslaw Smialy (1972)
 Landscape After the Battle (1970)
 Jak rozpętałem drugą wojnę światową (1970)
 The First Day of Freedom (1964)
 Five Boys from Barska Street (1954)

External links

1929 births
1973 deaths
Polish male film actors
20th-century Polish male actors